George "Professor" Burchett (23 August 1872 – 3 April 1953) was an English tattoo artist known as the "King of Tattooists".

Profile
Burchett was born George Burchett-Davis on 23 August 1872 in the English seaside town of Brighton, East Sussex. He was expelled from school at age 12 for tattooing his classmates. He joined the Royal Navy at age 13 (see boy seaman). After absconding from the Navy, he returned to England.

In 1900, Burchett became a full-time tattoo artist. With studios on Mile End Road and at 72 Waterloo Road, London, Burchett became the first star tattooist and a favourite among the wealthy upper class and European royalty. Among his customers were King Alfonso XIII of Spain, King Frederick IX of Denmark, and performer Horace "The Great Omi" Ridler. Though it was reputed that he tattooed the "Sailor King" George V of the United Kingdom, there is no reliable evidence to attest to this actually being the case.

He constantly designed new tattoos from his worldwide travel, incorporating African, Japanese and Southeast Asian motifs into his work. In the 1930s, he developed cosmetic tattooing with such techniques as permanently darkening eyebrows.

He continued tattooing until his sudden death on Good Friday in 1953 at the age of 80. A purported autobiography, Memoirs of a Tattooist, edited by Peter Leighton (a pseudonym of writer Edward Spiro, also known as EH Cookridge), was published in 1958 by Oldbourne Book Company, five years after Burchett's death. This work included photographs illustrating some of Burchett's tattoo designs. Recent research has revealed that, despite the claims made in the foreword, the text was not actually compiled and edited from Burchett's own notes, but cribbed quickly from newspaper articles made shortly after Burchett's death.

See also

 Tom Riley
 Sutherland Macdonald

Selected bibliography
 .
 .

References

 
 

1872 births
1953 deaths
British tattoo artists
19th-century British artists
19th-century British male artists
20th-century British artists
20th-century British male artists
People from Brighton
Royal Navy sailors